Gulf of Mersin is one of the widest gulfs in Turkey. It is in the northeast of the Mediterranean  Sea between the gulfs of İskenderun and Antalya.

Location 
The gulf of Mersin is between Taşucu  in the west and Karataş  in the east. The total distance between these two points is approximately  115 km. ( ≈ 71 mi or 62 nmi). The city of Mersin is roughly at the center of the coastline. The total water surface is about 2 300 km2 ( ≈ 888 mi2 )  The deepest point is  365 m ( ≈ 1197 ft.) The western region of the gulf is slightly deeper than the eastern region.

Rivers 
The main rivers to the gulf are Göksu in the west, Berdan (Tarsus) and Seyhan in the east. There are also a number of smaller rivers such as Alata, Limonlu, Tece, Mezitli and Müftü. (The smaller rivers usually have irregular flow rates depending on the season.)

Coastal settlement 
The biggest city of the gulf is Mersin which is one of the metropolitan centers in Turkey. Port of Mersin with a well established harbor and related infrastructure is one of the biggest ports of Turkey. The port is mainly oriented towards export. 

Erdemli which is in the west of Mersin is a district center. Taşucu and Karataş are smaller towns. In Taşucu, there is a minor port which is a terminal for Cyprus ferries. Just east of Taşucu there is a fishery in the delta of Göksu. Along the coast there are also coastal villages most of which are specialised in citrus production.

References 

Mersin
Landforms of Mersin Province
Gulfs of the Mediterranean